Events in the year 1949 in China.

Incumbents 
Republic of China:
President: Chiang Kai-shek (-January 21), Li Zongren (January 21-)
Premiers: Sun Fo, He Yingqin, Yan Xishan
People's Republic of China:
 Chairman of the Chinese Communist Party: Mao Zedong
 Chairman of the Government: Mao Zedong
 Premier: Zhou Enlai

Events

January
 21 January — Chiang Kai-shek resigns from the presidency in a "temporary absence". Vice President Li Zongren was named as the successor

April
 23 April — Communists capture the KMT's capital, Nanjing

June
 the Communist Party organised a "Chinese People's Political Consultative Conference" (CPPCC) to prepare for the establishment of a "New Democracy" regime to replace the Kuomintang-dominated Republic of China government

July
 Tropical storm Irma kills 1,600 people and destroys more than 63,000 houses in Shanghai, the worst typhoon on record in the city.

September
21 September — The first meeting of the CPPCC, which was attended by the Communist Party along with eight aligned parties
27 September — Establishment of the Flag of the People's Republic of China, a red field charged in the canton (upper corner nearest the flagpole) with five golden stars.

October

 1 October – The People's Republic of China is officially proclaimed in Beijing
 17 October – Chinese communist troops take Guangzhou.
 25–27 October — Battle of Guningtou in Kinmen, Fujian
 27 October — Chinese communist troops fail to take Kinmen in the Battle of Kuningtou; their advance towards Taiwan is halted.

December
 8 December — The government of the Republic of China finishes its evacuation to Taiwan, and declares Taipei its temporary capital city.
 17 December — Burma recognizes the People's Republic of China.
 30 December — India recognizes the People's Republic of China.

Deaths
 September 6 – Yang Hucheng, a Chinese warlord during the Warlord Era of Republican China and Kuomintang general during the Chinese Civil War (born 1893)

See also 
 1949 in Chinese film

References 

 
Years of the 20th century in China
China